Beigel Bake is a 24-hour bakery and shop founded in 1974, on Brick Lane in Spitalfields, London, England.

Bakery
Its menu is focused on beigels, baked in the traditional Jewish style with fillings such as hot salt beef with mustard, chopped herring, and cream cheese and salmon. It also serves pastries and sweets such as Danish rolls, apple strudel, Eccles cakes and cheesecake, as well as white, rye and black bread. Beigel Bake produces 7,000 beigels every day.

The restaurant was rated three stars by Time Out London magazine in 2010 (four stars by the magazine's online users).  It was also featured as a location in the photographic pictorial Life in the East End by London-based cabaret duo EastEnd Cabaret.

See also
 List of bakeries

References

External links
Official website

Ashkenazi Jewish culture in London
Bagel companies
Bakeries of the United Kingdom
Buildings and structures in the London Borough of Tower Hamlets
Jews and Judaism in London
Spitalfields